XHUE-FM is a radio station on 99.3 FM in Tuxtla Gutiérrez, Chiapas. The station is owned by Organización Radiofónica Mexicana and is known as Romántica.

History
XEUE-AM 580 received its concession on March 7, 1957. It was owned by La Voz de Chiapas, S.A. For decades, and until the AM-FM migration, it broadcast with 1,000 watts day and 200 night.

As part of wholesale format and operator changes at Radiorama Chiapas in August 2019, XHUE dropped La Bestia Grupera to take on a new and local format, "Radio Zoque".

On February 15, 2021, XHUE and XHLM-FM 105.9 exchanged formats, with 99.3 taking on XHLM's former romantic music format.

References

Radio stations in Chiapas
Radio stations established in 1957